Supernova Spira is a supertall mixed use skyscraper  in Noida, Uttar Pradesh, India. It is located in Sector 94, Amrapali Marg, Noida. At 300 meters and 80 floors it is the tallest  tower in northern India and the second tallest skyscraper in India.

Construction update
 As of October 2015, construction of Supernova Spira by Supertech has been completed by 40%, almost 34 floors.
 As of January 2016, construction of Supernova Spira by Supertech has been completed 38 floors.
 As of June 2018, construction of Supernova Spira by Supertech has reached more than 200 meters having 58 floors completed.
 As of July 2020, construction of Supernova Spira by Supertech has been completed up to 74th floor.
 Expected completion date is by late 2022.

See also
 List of tallest buildings in Delhi
 List of tallest buildings in India

References

Buildings and structures under construction in India
Skyscrapers in India
Noida
Twisted buildings and structures